Gmina Kodeń is a rural gmina (administrative district) in Biała Podlaska County, Lublin Voivodeship, in eastern Poland, on the border with Belarus.

Villages
Gmina Kodeń contains the villages and settlements of Dobratycze, Dobromyśl, Elżbiecin, Kąty, Kodeń, Kopytów, Kopytów-Kolonia, Kostomłoty, Kożanówka, Okczyn, Olszanki, Szostaki, Zabłocie, Zabłocie-Kolonia, Zagacie and Zalewsze.

Neighbouring gminas
Gmina Kodeń is bordered by the gminas of Piszczac, Sławatycze, Terespol and Tuczna. It also borders Belarus.

References

External links
Polish official population figures 2006

Koden
Biała Podlaska County